Lee Geunbae (born March 1, 1940), is a South Korean sijo poet. He is known for his  compositions on Korea's traditions and indigenous environments. He is one of the major contemporary sijo poets. In 2002, he was chosen as chairman of the Society of Korean Poets. He has served as the director of the Korean Headquarters of the International PEN. He is currently a creative writing professor at JEI University.

Life 
Lee Geunbae was born on March 1, 1940, in Dangjin, Chungcheongnam-do. His pen name is Sacheon. In 1958 he started studying creative writing at Seorabeol Art College and practiced poetry. Before his literary debut, he had already published in 1960 his first collection Sarangeul yeonjuhaneun kkotnamu (사랑을 연주하는 꽃나무 The Flower Tree That Sings Love). He began his literary career in 1961 when he won the Kyunghyang Daily News New Writer's Award with sijo Myobimyeong (묘비명 The Epitaph), as well as the Seoul Shinmun New Writer's Contest with Byeok (벽 The Wall). And until 1964 he also had sijo as well as children's poems selected for contests from Chosun Ilbo and Don-A Ilbo. He is the only writer in Korea to have won a new writer's contest four times. He was also the publisher and editor-in-chief of Hankook Munhak, and editor-in-chief of Minjokgwa munhak. He has served as the president of the Association of Korean Sijo Poets, the president of the Society of Korean Poets, the deputy director of the Korean Writers Association, and the director of the Korean Headquarters of the International PEN. He has taught poetry writing and theory on poetry at Seoul Institute of the Arts, Chugye University for the Arts, and Chung-Ang University. He is currently serving as the president of the Jiyonghoe (지용회) and the Association for Commemoration of Gong Cho, and he is a creative writing professor at JEI University. He has won the New Artist Award, the Garam Sijo Literary Award, the Republic of Korea Writer Award, the Joongang Sijo Grand Prize, the Hyundae Buddhist Literature Prize, the Cheong Chi-Yong Literature Prize, and the Manhae Literature Prize.

Writing 
Lee Geunbae's early sijos expressed affection for the mother country, his spiritual home country. By revealing the spirit of freedom based on humanism, he also displayed how sijo is a free verse form of a certain type, one that reaches the life's inner sides with emotions and rules. In the 1960s when he had debuted, there were too many poems in Korea that over-emphasized on social commentary or were difficult to understand. In such a time, Lee Geunbae's works contributed towards the revival of traditional lyricism.

Also, his later works often used historical figures as subject matter, laying out ‘historical imagination’ with lyrical melody. For example, in Chusareul humchida (추사를 훔치다 Stealing Chusa), by poetizing Kim Jeong-hui and Kim Byeong-yeon, two greats figures from the Joseon Dynasty, he summoned the long gone tradition and beauty of the past.

Meanwhile, from a formal perspective, Lee Geunbae's sijo often mixes the forms of saseol sijo and pyeong sijo. How he is not bound within one form is a result of his critical mindset that wants to restructure the past from a modern perspective, despite his attachment to the things of the past.

He attempts to have the spirit of a seonbi, possessing morality and generosity in a corrupt world. However, his ultimate goal is to have a poetic spirit like a sinseon's (a Taoist hermit with mystical powers), that "listens with the eyes, sees with the nose, and talks with the ears." As such, through his tranquil sijo, he has visualized the emptiness of the world, and the nature of humanity. His works are considered as literary instances where modern society and inner humanity were explored through the traditional form of sijo.

Works

Poetry collections 
 Sarangeul yeonjuhaneun kkotnamu (사랑을 연주하는 꽃나무 The Flower Tree That Sings Love), 1960.
 Noraeyeo noraeyeo (노래여 노래여 A Song, a Song), MunhakSegyeSa, 1981
 Hangang (한강 Han River), Goryeowon, 1985
 Saramdeuli saega doego sipeun kkadalgeul anda (사람들이 새가 되고 싶은 까닭을 안다 I Know Why People Want to be Birds), MunhakSegyeSa, 2004
 Jongsorineun kkeuteopsi saebyeokeul kkaeunda (종소리는 끝없이 새벽을 깨운다 The Bells Endlessly Awaken the Dawn), Donghaksa, 2006.
 Chusareul humchida (추사를 훔치다 Stealing Chusa), Moonhak Soochup,  2013.

Awards 
 1983 Garam Sijo Literary Award
 1987 Republic of Korea Writer Award
 1987 Joongang Sijo Grand Prize, 
 1997 Yukdang Literature Prize
 1999 Wolha Literature Prize
 2000 Pyeon-un Literature Prize
 2010 Gosan Literature Prize
 2011 Manhae Prize
 2015 Jeong Jiyong Literature Prize

References

Further reading 
 O, Geodon, Bujakran-byeoruilgi-Lee Geunbae (부작란-벼루읽기-이근배), Sijo sihak 49, Goyoachim 2013.

External links 
 Naver People Search
 LTI Korea Moscow event

1940 births
Living people
20th-century South Korean poets
21st-century South Korean poets
South Korean male poets
Jeong Jiyong Literature Prize winners
Society of Korean Poets Award winners
20th-century male writers
21st-century male writers